Magdalena de Guzmán (d. 1621), was a Spanish courtier.

She was the chief lady-in-waiting of three queens of Spains in succession: Elisabeth of Valois, Margaret of Austria, Queen of Spain and Elisabeth of France (1602–1644). She served as royal governess to Anne of Austria. Her offices made her an influential figure at court, particularly during the tenure of 
Margaret of Austria, during which she participated in the queen's court fraction against Francisco Gómez de Sandoval, 1st Duke of Lerma.

References

1621 deaths
Spanish ladies-in-waiting
16th-century Spanish women
17th-century Spanish women